GRB may refer to:
 Gage Roads Brewing Company, an Australian brewery
 Game Rating Board, a South Korean game rating organization
 Gamma-ray burst, an astronomical event
 George R. Brown Convention Center, in Houston, Texas, United States
 Great Bentley railway station, in Essex, England
 Grebo language, spoken in Liberia and Ivory Coast
 Green Bay-Austin Straubel International Airport, in Wisconsin, United States
 Granzyme B, serine protease most commonly found in the granules of NK cells and cytotoxic T cells
 GRB Studios, an American television production company